Nick is a masculine given name. It is  also often encountered as a short form (hypocorism) of the given names Nicholas, Nicola,  Nicolas, Nikola, Nicolai or Nicodemus. It may refer to:

Given name

A
Nick Abbot (born 1960), British broadcaster and radio talk show host
Nick Abendanon (born 1986), Dutch rugby player
Nick Abruzzese (born 1999), American ice hockey player
Nick Acquaviva (1927–2003), American composer and band leader
Nick Adams (disambiguation), multiple people
Nick Adduci (1929–2005), American football player
Nick Adenhart (1986–2009), American baseball player
Nick Afoa (born 1986), New Zealand tenor and rugby union player
Nick Ahmed (born 1990), American baseball player
Nick Akins (born 1961), American CEO of American Electric Power
Nick Aldis (born 1986), English wrestler
Nick Allegretti (born 1996), American football player
Nick Allen (1888–1939), American baseball player
Nick Anderson (disambiguation), multiple people
Nick Ansell (born 1994), Australian footballer
Nick Awde (born 1961), British writer, artist, singer-songwriter, and critic
Nick Ayers (born 1982), American political strategist

B
Nick Bakay (born 1961), American actor and comedian
Nick Barnett (born 1981), American football player
Nick Bassett, American musician
Nick Bateman (disambiguation), multiple people
Nick Bawden (born 1996), American football player
Nick Beggs (born 1961), English musician
Nick Bell (disambiguation), multiple people
Nick Bellore (born 1989), American football player
Nick Berg (1978–2004), American radio-tower repairman
Nick Berry (born 1963), English television actor and musician
Nick Best (born 1968), American strongman
Nick Beverley (born 1947), Canadian hockey player and coach
Nick Bitsko (born 2002), American baseball player
Nick Bjugstad (born 1992), American ice hockey player
Nick Blackburn (born 1982), American baseball player
Nick Blackman (born 1989), British-Israeli footballer
Nick Blackwell (born 1990), British boxer
Nick Blinko (born 1961), British musician and artist
Nick Blood (born 1982), English actor
Nick Bobeck (born 1980), American football coach
Nick Bockwinkel (1934–2015), American wrestler
Nick Bollettieri (born 1939), American tennis coach
Nick Bolton (born 2000), American football player
Nick Bonino (born 1988), American ice hockey player
Nick Boraine (born 1971), South African actor
Nick Bosa (born 1997), American football player
Nick Bostrom (born 1973), Swedish philosopher
Nick Bougas (born 1965), American film director
Nick Bourne (born 1952), British politician
Nick Bowers (born 1996), American football player
Nick Boyer (born 1993), American rugby union player
Nick Boyle (born 1993), American football player
Nick Boynton (born 1979), Canadian ice hockey player
Nick Broeker (born 2000), American football player
Nick Brossette (born 1996), American football player
Nick Bravin (born 1971), American Olympic fencer
Nick Brewer (born 1989), English rapper
Nick Bright, British radio DJ
Nick Brown (born 1950), British politician
Nick Bruno (born 1951), president of the University of Louisiana at Monroe
Nick Buoniconti (1940–2019), American football player
Nick Burdi (born 1993), American baseball player

C
Nick Caamano (born 1998), Canadian ice hockey player
Nick Cafardo (1956–2019), American sportswriter
Nick Caistor (born 1946), British journalist and translator
Nick Calathes (born 1989), Greek-American basketball player
Nick Cannon (born 1980), American comedian and rapper
Nick Capra (born 1958), American baseball manager
Nick Cardy (1920–2013), American comic book artist
Nick Carle (born 1981), Australian football player
Nick Carter (disambiguation), multiple people
Nick Cassavetes (born 1959), American actor and director
Nick Castle (born 1947), American screenwriter
Nick Catanese (born 1971), American musician
Nick Catone (born 1981), American mixed martial artist
Nick Cave (born 1957), Australian musician, songwriter, author, screenwriter, composer, and actor
Nick Cave (performance artist) (born 1959), American fabric sculptor, dancer, and performance artist
Nick Ceroli (1939–1985), American jazz drummer
Nick Charles (disambiguation), multiple people
Nick Chinlund (born 1961), American actor
Nick Chubb (born 1995), American football player
Nick Ciuffo (born 1995), American baseball player
Nick Civetta (born 1989), American rugby union player
Nick Clausen (1900–1989), Danish boxer
Nick Clegg (born 1967), British politician
Nick Clooney (born 1934), American journalist and television host
Nick Coe (born 1998), American football player
Nick Cohen (born 1961), English journalist, author, and political commentator
Nick Coleman (disambiguation), multiple people
Nick Collins (born 1983), American football player
Nick Collison (born 1980), American basketball player
Nick Cordero (1978–2020), Canadian actor
Nick Cousins (born 1993), Canadian ice hockey player
Nick Cravat (1912–1994), American actor and stunt performer
Nick Cross (disambiguation), multiple people
Nick Cummins (born 1987), Australian rugby union player
Nick Cunningham (born 1985), American bobsledder
Nick Curran (1977–2012), American singer and guitarist
Nick Cvjetkovich (born 1973), Canadian wrestler

D
Nick Daffy (born 1973), Australian footballer
Nick Dal Santo (born 1984), Australian footballer
Nick Damici (born 1959), American actor
Nick Damore (1916–1969), Canadian ice hockey player
Nick Dandolos (1883–1966), Greek professional gambler
Nick Dasovic (born 1968), Canadian soccer player
Nick Davies (born 1953), British investigative journalist, writer, and documentary maker
Nick Davila (born 1985), American football player
Nick Davis (disambiguation), multiple people
Nick Dear (born 1955), English writer for stage, screen, and radio
Nick DeCarbo (1910–1991), American football player
Nick DeFelice (born 1940), American football player
Nick DeLeon (born 1990), American soccer player
Nick DeLuca (born 1995), American football player
Nick Dempsey (born 1980), British windsurfer
Nick Dennis (1904–1980), American film actor
Nick Denton (born 1966), British Internet entrepreneur
Nick DePuy (born 1994), American soccer player
Nick De Santis (born 1967), American soccer player
Nick DeWolf (1928–2006), American entrepreneur 
Nick Diaz (born 1983), American mixed martial artist
Nick DiCeglie (born 1973), American politician
Nick DiDia (born 1962), American record producer, engineer, and mixer
Nick Didkovsky (born 1958), American composer and guitarist
Nick Digilio (born 1965), American movie critic and radio personality
Nick Dimitri (born 1932), American stuntman
Nick Dini (born 1993), American baseball player
Nick Dinsmore (born 1975), American wrestler
Nick Dioguardi (1932–2015), Italian racing driver
Nick Di Paolo (born 1962), American comedian and radio personality
Nick Dixon,  Scottish journalist and television presenter
Nick Dodge (born 1986), Canadian ice hockey player
Nick Doodeman (born 1996), Dutch footballer
Nick Dougherty (born 1982), English golfer
Nick Douglas (born 1967), American musician
Nick Downing (born 1980), American football player
Nick Drake (1948–1974), English singer-songwriter and musician
Nick Drnaso (born 1989), American author
Nick Duigan (born 1984), Australian rules footballer
Nick Dunning (born 1956/1957), English actor
Nick Dupree (1982–2017), American disability rights activist and writer
Nick D'Virgilio (born 1968), American musician
Nick Dyer-Witheford (born 1951), Canadian author and professor
Nick Dzubnar (born 1991), American football player

E
Nick Earls (born 1963), Australian novelist
Nick Easley (born 1997), American football player
Nick Eason (born 1980), American football player
Nick Easton (born 1992), American football player
Nick Easter (born 1978), English rugby union player
Nick Ebert (born 1994), American ice hockey player
Nick Eddy (born 1944), American football player
Nick Edwards (born 1984), Australian-American rugby union player
Nick Eeles (born 1961), British army officer
Nick Egan (born 1957), English visual designer
Nick Ellis (born 1953), American professor of psychology and research scientist
Nick Enright (1950–2003), Australian dramatist and playwright
Nick Eppehimer (born 1979), American basketball player
Nick Esasky (born 1960), American baseball player
Nick Etten (1913–1990), American baseball player
Nick Eubanks (born 1996), American football player
Nick Evans (disambiguation), multiple people
Nick Eversman (born 1986), American actor
Nick Eyre (1959–2018), American football player

F
Nick Fairley (born 1988), American football player
Nick Falcon (born 1968), American musician
Nick Faldo (born 1957), English golfer
Nick Fazekas (born 1985), American basketball player
Nick Fenton (born 1979), English footballer
Nick Fenton-Wells (born 1986), South African rugby union footballer
Nick Ferguson (born 1974), American football player
Nick Ferrari (born 1959), British radio host
Nick Fitzgerald (disambiguation), multiple people
Nick Flynn (born 1960), American writer and poet
Nick Foles (born 1989), American football player
Nick Folk (born 1984), American football player
Nick Ford (born 1999), American football player
Nick Apollo Forte (1938–2020), American musician
Nick Foster, British composer
Nick Foster (racing driver) (born 1965), British auto racer
Nick Fotiu (born 1952), American ice hockey player
Nick Fowler (born 1967), American writer and musician
Nick Freitas (born 1979), American politician and army veteran
Nick Frost (born 1972), English actor, comedian, and screenwriter
Nick Fry (born 1956), CEO of the Mercedes AMG Petronas Formula One team
Nick Fuentes (born 1998), American far-right political commentator and podcaster
Nick Fyffe (born 1972), English bassist

G
Nick Gabaldon (1927–1951), American surfer
Nick Gaetano, American cover artist
Nick Gaffaney (born 1978), New Zealand drummer and singer
Nick Gage (born 1980), wrestler
Nick Galifianakis (disambiguation), multiple people
Nick Gardewine (born 1993), American baseball player 
Nick Gates (disambiguation), multiple people
Nick Geber, English radio and television personality
Nick Gedney (born 1960), English darts player
Nick Gehlfuss (born 1985), American actor
Nick Gelavis (born 1929), Australian rules footballer
Nick Gentry (born 1980), British artist
Nick George (disambiguation), multiple people
Nick Gevers (born 1965), South African editor and literary critic
Nick Gibb (born 1960), British Conservative politician
Nick Gill (born 1982), Australian football player
Nick Gillard (born 1959), American stuntman
Nick Gillespie (born 1963), American libertarian journalist
Nick Glennie-Smith (born 1951), English film score composer
Nick Goepper (born 1994), American freestyle skier
Nick Goings (born 1978), American football player
Nick Gomez (born 1963), American film director and writer
Nick Gonzales (born 1999), American baseball player
Nick Goody (born 1991), American baseball player
Nick Gordon (born 1995), American baseball player
Nick Gore (born 1974), Finnish bass player
Nick Gravenites (born 1938), American singer-songwriter
Nick Green (disambiguation), multiple people
Nick Greenwood (born 1987), American baseball player
Nick Gregory (born 1960), American meteorologist 
Nick Greiner (born 1947), Australian businessman and politician
Nick Greisen (born 1979), American football player
Nick Griffin (born 1959), English politician
Nick Griffin (comedian) (born 1966), American comedian
Nick Grimshaw (born 1984), English television and radio presenter
Nick Groff (born 1980), American paranormal investigator
Nick Gross (born 1988), American entrepreneur
Nick Gwiazdowski (born 1992), American wrestler

H
Nick Haden (born 1962), American football player
Nick Hague (born 1975), American astronaut 
Nick Hakim (born 1993), American musician
Nick Hamm (born 1957), American film and television director
Nick Hammond (born 1967), English footballer
Nick Hampton (born 1967), British businessman
Nick Hampton (American football) (born 2000), American football player
Nick Hanauer (born 1959), American entrepreneur
Nick Hardwick (disambiguation), multiple people
Nick Hardy (born 1996), American golfer
Nick Harkaway (born 1972), British novelist
Nick Harris (disambiguation), multiple people
Nick Hayden (born 1986), American football player
Nick Hawk (born 1981), American actor and reality television star
Nick Heath (baseball) (born 1993), American baseball player
Nick Hegarty (born 1986), English footballer
Nick Heidfeld (born 1977), German racing driver
Nick Hein (born 1984), German mixed martial artist
Nick Helm (born 1980), English comedian
Nick Hemming (born 1973), English musician and guitarist
Nick Hendrix (born 1985), English actor
Nick Hennessey (born 1986), American football player
Nick Herbert (physicist) (born 1936), American physicist
Nick Hewer (born 1944), English public relations consultant and television presenter
Nick Hexum (born 1970), American musician and songwriter
Nick Heyward (born 1961), English singer-songwriter
Nick Hill (born 1985), American football player
Nick Hinds (born 1997), American soccer player
Nick Hipa (born 1982), American heavy metal guitarist
Nick Hodgson (born 1977), English drummer and vocalist
Nick Hoffman (born 1979), American singer-songwriter
Nick Hogan (born 1990), American reality television personality and actor
Nick Holden (born 1987), Canadian ice hockey player
Nick Holder (born 1969), American hip-hop DJ
Nick Holmes (disambiguation), multiple people
Nick Holonyak (born 1928), American engineer and educator
Nick Holt (born 1962), college football coach
Nick Hornby (born 1957), English novelist, essayist, lyricist, and screenwriter
Nick Howard (baseball) (born 1993), American baseball player
Nick Howell (born 1980), American football coach
Nick Hudson (born 1983), Australian rower
Nick Hundley (born 1983), American baseball player
Nick Hurd (born 1962), British Conservative Member of Parliament
Nick Hurran (born 1959), British film and television director

I
Nick Ienatsch (born 1961/1962), American motorcycle racer, writer, and instructor
Nick Igel (born 1972), American soccer player
Nick Inch (born 1984), Canadian lacrosse player
Nick Ingels (born 1984), Belgian road bicycle racer
Nick Ingman (born 1948), English arranger, composer, and conductor
Nick Isiekwe (born 1998), English rugby union player
Nick Ivanoff, American businessman

J
Nick James (disambiguation), multiple people
Nick Jameson (born 1950), American actor
Nick Jardine (born 1943), British mathematician
Nick Jeavons (born 1957), English rugby union player
Nick Jenkins (born 1967), English businessman
Nick Jennings (disambiguation), multiple people
Nick Jensen (born 1990), American ice hockey player
Nick Joaquin (1917–2004), Filipino writer, historian, and journalist
Nick Johnson (disambiguation), multiple people
Nick Jonas (born 1992), member of pop-rock band the Jonas Brothers
Nick Jones (disambiguation), multiple people

K
Nick Kaczur (born 1979), American football player
Nick Kaiser (born 1954), British cosmologist
Nick Kamen (1962–2021), English male model, songwriter, and musician
Nick Kasa (born 1990), American football player
Nick Katz (born 1943), American mathematician
Nick Kay (born 1992), Australian basketball player
Nick Keizer (born 1995), American football player
Nick Kellington (born 1976), British actor and musician
Nick Kellogg (born 1991), American basketball player
Nick Kelly (born 1993), Australian-New Zealand cricketer
Nick Kennedy (born 1982), English rugby union player
Nick Kenny (disambiguation), multiple people
Nick Kent (born 1951), British rock critic and musician
Nick D. Kim, cartoonist
Nick King (disambiguation), multiple people
Nick Kingham (born 1991), American baseball player
Nick Kiriazis (born 1969), American television actor
Nick Kisner (born 1991), American boxer
Nick Knight (disambiguation), multiple people
Nick Knowles (born 1962), English television presenter
Nick Knox (1958–2018), American drummer
Nick Kokonas (born 1968), American restaurant executive
Nick Kolarac (born 1992), American soccer player
Nick Kosir (born 1983), American meteorologist 
Nick Kotik (born 1950), Democratic member of the Pennsylvania House of Representatives
Nick Kotys (1913–2005), American football coach
Nick Kotz (1932–2020), American journalist and historian
Nick Krause (born 1992), American film and television actor
Nick Krall (born 1977), American baseball executive
Nick Kroll (born 1978), American actor, screenwriter, producer, and comedian
Nick Kwiatkoski (born 1993), American football player
Nick Kypreos (born 1966), Canadian ice hockey player
Nick Kyrgios (born 1995), Australian tennis player

L
Nick Lachey (born 1973), American singer-songwriter, actor, producer, and television personality
Nick Laird (born 1975), Northern Irish novelist and poet
Nick Laird-Clowes (born 1957), English musician and composer
Nick Lampson (born 1945), American politician
Nick Land (born 1962), English philosopher
Nick Lane (born 1967), British biochemist
Nick Lappin (born 1992), American ice hockey player
Nick Larkey (born 1998), Australian rules footballer
Nick LaRocca (1889–1961), American jazz cornetist and trumpeter
Nick Lashaway (1988–2016), American actor
Nick Lassa (1898–1964), American football player
Nick Launay (born 1960), English record producer, composer, and recording engineer
Nick Lazzarini (born 1984), American dancer
Nick Leddy (born 1991), American ice hockey player
Nick Lee (disambiguation), multiple people
Nick Leeson (born 1967), English trader
Nick Leventis (born 1980), British racing driver
Nick Leverett (born 1997), American football player
Nick Leyva (born 1953), American baseball coach
Nick Licata (disambiguation), multiple people
Nick Lima (born 1994), American soccer player
Nick Littlemore (born 1978), Australian musician
Nick Lodolo (born 1998), American baseball player
Nick Loeb (born 1975), American businessman and actor
Nick Loftin (born 1998), American baseball player
Nick Loren (born 1970), American actor
Nick Love (born 1969), English film director and writer
Nick Lower (born 1987), Australian footballer
Nick Lowery (born 1956), American football player
Nick Lucas (1897–1982), American singer and jazz guitarist

M
Nick Macpherson (born 1959), British civil servant
Nick Madrigal (born 1997), American baseball player
Nick Magnus (born 1955), British keyboard player
Nick Maley (born 1949), British make-up artist
Nick Mamatas (born 1972), American author and editor
Nick Mancuso (born 1948), Italian-Canadian actor
Nick Mangold (born 1984), American football player
Nick Mantis (1935–2017), American-Greek basketball player
Nick Marck (born 1958), American television director
Nick Margevicius (born 1996), American baseball player
Nick Markakis (born 1983), American baseball player
Nick Marshall (born 1992), American football player
Nick Martin (disambiguation), multiple people
Nick Martinez (disambiguation), multiple people
Nick Martini (born 1990), American baseball player
Nick Mason (born 1944), English musician and composer
Nick Masset (born 1982), American baseball player
Nick Massi (1927–2000), American bass singer and bass guitarist
Nick McArdle, Australian TV and radio presenter
Nick McCabe (born 1971), English musician
Nick McCarthy (born 1974), Scottish musician
Nick McCloud (born 1998), American football player
Nick McDonald (born 1987), American football player
Nick McKenzie, Australian investigative journalist
Nick McKeown, American professor
Nick McKinnel (born 1954), English Anglican bishop
Nick McLean (born 1941), American cinematographer
Nick Mears (born 1996), American baseball player
Nick Meglin (1935–2018), American writer and artist
Nick Mennell (born 1976), American actor
Nick Menza (1964–2016), American drummer
Nick Metz (1914–1990), Canadian ice hockey player
Nick Middleton (born 1960), British physical geographer
Nick Mike-Mayer (born 1950), American football player
Nick Miller (disambiguation), multiple people
Nick Mira (born 2000), American record producer and songwriter
Nick Mitchell (born 1982), American wrestler
Nick Mohammed (born 1980), British actor and writer
Nick Monaco, American DJ
Nick Mondek (born 1988), American football player
Nick Montana (born 1992), American football player
Nick Montgomery (born 1981), English-Scottish footballer
Nick George Montos (1916–2008), American criminal and gangster
Nick Moody (born 1990), American football player
Nick Moore (American football) (born 1992), American football player
Nick Moran (born 1969), English actor, writer, producer, and director
Nick Moss (born 1969), American blues singer
Nick Mourouzis (1937–2020), American football player and coach
Nick Mullens (born 1995), American football player
Nick Mulvey (born 1984), English musician
Nick Muse (born 1998), American football player
Nick Muszynski (born 1998), American basketball player
Nick Mutuma (born 1988), Kenyan actor
Nick Mwendwa (born 1979), Kenyan businessman

N
Nick Nairn (born 1959), Scottish chef
Nick Nanton (born 1980), Barbadian-American director and author
Nick Naumenko (born 1974), American ice hockey player
Nick Navarro (1929–2011), Cuban-American businessman
Nick Neidert (born 1996), American baseball player
Nick Nelson (born 1996), American football player
Nick Nelson (baseball) (born 1995), American baseball player
Nick Neri (born 1995), American racing driver
Nick Nevern (born 1980), British actor and director
Nick Newell (born 1986), American mixed martial artist
Nick Nickell (born 1947), American bridge player
Nick Nieland (born 1972), British javelin thrower
Nick Niemann (born 1997), American football player
Nick Noble (soccer) (born 1984), American soccer player
Nick Noble (singer) (1926–2012), American singer
Nick Nola (born 1985), Ugandan singer and dancer
Nick Nolte (born 1941), American actor
Nick Noonan (born 1989), baseball player
Nick Novak (born 1981), American football player
Nick Nuccio (1901–1989), American politician
Nick Nurse (born 1967), American basketball coach
Nick Nuyens (born 1980), Belgian road racing cyclist

O
Nick O'Brien (born 1993), Australian footballer
Nick O'Donnell (hurler) (1925–1988), Irish hurler
Nick O'Donnell (footballer) (born 1993), Filipino footballer
Nick Offerman (born 1970), American actor, writer, humorist, and carpenter
Nick O'Hern (born 1971), Australian golfer
Nick O'Leary (born 1992), American football player
Nick Oliveri (born 1971), American musician
Nick O'Malley (born 1985), bass guitarist
Nick Orr (born 1995), American football player
Nick Oshiro (born 1978), American musician
Nick Osipczak (born 1984), English professional mixed martial artist
Nick Owen (born 1947), English television presenter and newsreader

P
Nick Pace (born 1987), American professional mixed martial artist
Nick Pacheco (born 1964), American lawyer and politician
Nick Palatas (born 1988), American actor
Nick Palmer (born 1950), British politician and computer scientist
Nick Palmieri (born 1989), American ice hockey player
Nick Park (born 1958), English director, writer, and animator
Nick Patrick (disambiguation), multiple people
Nick Patsaouras (born 1943), American urban planner
Nick Paul (born 1995), Canadian ice hockey player
Nick Paulos (born 1992), Greek-American basketball player
Nick Payne (born 1984), British playwright
Nick Perito (1924–2005), Hollywood composer and arranger
Nick Perri (born 1984), guitarist, songwriter, and producer
Nick Perry (disambiguation), multiple people
Nick Peters (1939–2015), American baseball writer
Nick Piantanida (1932–1966), American amateur parachute jumper
Nick Piccininni (born 1996), American folkstyle wrestler
Nick Picciuto (1921–1997), American baseball player
Nick Pitera (born 1986), American vocal artist
Nick Pivetta (born 1993), American baseball player
Nick Plott (born 1984), American eSports commentator
Nick Polano (1941–2019), ice hockey coach
Nick Pope (disambiguation), multiple people
Nick Powell (born 1994), English footballer
Nick Pratto (born 1998), American baseball player
Nick Price (born 1957), Zimbabwean golfer
Nick Prisco (1909–1981), American football player
Nick Pugh (born 1967), American artist and designer
Nick Punto (born 1977), American baseball player

Q
Nick Quartaro (born 1955), American football player and coach

R
Nick Rahall (born 1949), American Democratic politician
Nick Rakocevic (born 1997), American-Serbian basketball player
Nick Ralston (born 1996), American football player
Nick Ramirez (born 1989), American baseball player
Nick Ramus (1929–2007), American actor
Nick Raphael (born 1971), English music industry executive
Nick Rapone (born 1956), American football coach
Nick Raskulinecz (born 1970), American record producer
Nick Rassas (born 1944), American football player
Nick Rathod (born 1975), American businessman
Nick Rattigan (born 1992), American singer-songwriter and vocalist
Nick Read (born 1964), British businessman
Nick Redfern (born 1964), British author and journalist
Nick Reding (disambiguation), multiple people
Nick Reed (born 1987), American football player
Nick Rerras (born 1957), American politician
Nick Revell, British comedian
Nick Reynolds (1933–2008), American folk musician
Nick Reynoldson, Canadian comedian
Nick Rhodes (born 1962), English musician
Nick Ricci (born 1959), Canadian ice hockey player
Nick Richards (singer-songwriter) (born 1960), British singer-songwriter
Nick Richards (basketball) (born 1997), American basketball player
Nick Richmond (born 1987), American football player
Nick Rickles (born 1990), American-Israeli baseball player
Nick Ries (born 1982), Australian footballer
Nick Riewoldt (born 1982), Australian footballer
Nick Rimando (born 1979), American soccer player
Nick Ring (born 1979), American-Canadian mixed martial artist
Nick Rivera (disambiguation), multiple people
Nick Rizzo (born 1979), Australian footballer
Nick Roach (born 1985), American football player
Nick Robertson (disambiguation), multiple people
Nick Robinson (disambiguation), multiple people
Nick Rodriguez (born 1996), American grappler
Nick Rogers (disambiguation), multiple people
Nick Rolovich (born 1979), American football coach
Nick Roman (1947–2003), American football player
Nick Rose (disambiguation), multiple people
Nick Ross (disambiguation), multiple people
Nick Roth (born 1985), American screenwriter and actor
Nick Rumbelow (born 1991), American baseball player
Nick Rush (born 1968), American Republican politician
Nick Russell (disambiguation), multiple people
Nick Rutherford (born 1985), American actor and comedian

S
Nick Saban (born 1951), American college football coach
Nick Saenz (born 1990), American football player
Nick Sagan (born 1970), American novelist and screenwriter
Nick Saglimbeni, American visual artist
Nick Sakiewicz (born 1961), American lacrosse executive
Nick Sandow (born 1966), American actor
Nick Sauer (born 1982), American politician
Nick Schifrin (born 1980), American news correspondent
Nick Schmaltz (born 1996), American ice hockey player
Nick Schulman (born 1984), American poker player
Nick Sciba (born 1999), American football player
Nick Scott (disambiguation), multiple people
Nick Scotti (born 1966), American actor and singer
Nick Searcy (born 1959), American actor
Nick Seeler (born 1993), American ice hockey player
Nick Seither (born 1993), American football player
Nick Senzel (born 1995), American baseball player
Nick Setta (born 1981), American football player
Nick Seymour (born 1958), Australian musician
Nick Sheppard (born 1960), British guitarist
Nick Sheridan (born 1988), American football player and coach
Nick Sidi (born 1966), English actor
Nick Simmons (born 1989), American writer and son of Gene Simmons
Nick Sinclair (born 1963), British photographer
Nick Sirianni (born 1981), American football coach
Nick Sirota (born 1984), American ice hockey player
Nick Skelton (born 1957), British equestrian athlete
Nick Skorich (1921–2004), American football player
Nick Solak (born 1995), American baseball player
Nick Solares (born 1968), British food writer
Nick Soolsma (born 1988), Dutch footballer
Nick Sorensen (born 1978), American football player and coach
Nick Sousanis, American art critic and cartoonist
Nick Spalding (born 1974), British novelist
Nick Spano (born 1976), American acting coach
Nick Spencer (born 1967), American comic book writer
Nick Spires (born 1994), English-Swedish basketball player
Nick Srnicek (born 1982), Canadian writer
Nick Stabile (born 1971), American actor
Nick Stahl (born 1979), American actor
Nick Stellino (born 1958), Italian-American television chef
Nick Stevens (disambiguation), multiple people
Nick Stewart (1910–2000), American television and film actor
Nick Suban (born 1990), Australian football player
Nick Sundberg (born 1987), American football player
Nick Suriano (born 1997), American freestyle wrestler
Nick Suzuki (born 1999), Canadian ice hockey player
Nick Swardson (born 1976), American actor, comedian, screenwriter, and producer
Nick Swinmurn, American entrepreneur
Nick Swisher (born 1980), American baseball player
Nick Symmonds (born 1983), American middle-distance track athlete
Nick Szabo (born 1964), American computer scientist

T
Nick Taitague (born 1999), American soccer player
Nick Talbot (born 1965), British scientist
Nick Tandy (born 1984), British racecar driver
Nick Tanner (disambiguation), multiple people 
Nick E. Tarabay (born 1975), American actor
Nick Tate (born 1942), Australian actor
Nick Tauber (born 1942), British record producer
Nick Taylor (disambiguation), multiple people
Nick Teo (born 1989), Singaporean television actor
Nick Tepesch (born 1988), American baseball player
Nick Thomas (disambiguation), multiple people
Nick Thomas-Symonds (born 1980), Welsh politician
Nick Thoman (born 1986), American swimmer
Nick Thompson (disambiguation), multiple people
Nick Thorpe (born 1960), British journalist and filmmaker
Nick Thune (born 1979), American actor, comedian, and musician
Nick Thurman (born 1995), American football player
Nick Thurston (born 1987), American actor
Nick Timothy (born 1980), British political advisor
Nick Toczek (born 1950), British writer
Nick Todd (born 1935), American pop singer
Nick Toon (born 1988), American football player
Nick Tosches (1949–2019), American journalist, novelist, biographer, and poet
Nick Townsend (born 1994), English footballer
Nick J. Townsend (born 1975), English musician and columnist
Nick Traina (1978–1997), American singer
Nick Trask (born 1978), Australian footballer
Nick Tropeano (born 1990), American baseball player
Nick Truesdell (born 1990), American football player
Nick Turner, British drummer
Nick Turvey (1931–2006), aerobatic and air show pilot in South Africa

U
Nick Udall (1913–2005), mayor of Phoenix, Arizona, 1948–52
Nick Uhas (born 1985), American TV host and actor
Nick Ullett (born 1941), British-born American actor
Nick Ut (born 1951), Vietnamese-American photographer for the Associated Press

V
Nick Valensi (born 1981), American musician
Nick Vallelonga (born 1959), American actor and producer
Nick van der Velden (born 1981), Dutch footballer who played for Bali United
Nick Van Eede (born 1958), English musician
Nick Van Exel (born 1971), American basketball player and coach
Nick Vannett (born 1993), American football player
Nick Vanos (1963–1987), American basketball player
Nick Varner (born 1948), American pool player
Nick Vaux (born 1936), British officer
Nick Veasey (born 1962), British photographer
Nick Venet (1936–1998), American record producer
Nick Verreos (born 1967), American fashion designer, fashion commentator, and Project Runway contestant
Nick Viall (born 1980), American actor and TV personality
Nick Viergever (born 1989), Dutch footballer
Nick Vigil (born 1993), American football player
Nick Vincent (disambiguation), multiple people
Nick Virgilio (1928–1989), American haiku poet
Nick Vlastuin (born 1994), Australian footballer
Nick Volpe (born 1926), Canadian football player
Nick von Esmarch (born 1976), American actor
Nick Vujicic (born 1982), Australian Christian evangelist and motivational speaker
Nick Voss, Australian artist

W
Nick Wakeling (born 1971), Australian politician
Nick Waisome (born 1992), American football player
Nick Walker (disambiguation), multiple people
Nick Walne (born 1975), Welsh rugby union player
Nick Waplington (born 1965), British artist and photographer
Nick Ward (disambiguation), multiple people
Nick Warner (born 1950), Australian diplomat and public servant
Nick Warren (born 1968), English house DJ and producer
Nick Wasicsko (1959–1993), American politician
Nick Waterhouse (born 1986), American singer-songwriter
Nick Watney (born 1981), American golfer
Nick Watt (CNN reporter), American news reporter
Nick Weatherspoon (1950–2008), American basketball player
Nick Webb (disambiguation), multiple people
Nick Webster (born 1964), American soccer coach
Nick Wechsler (disambiguation), multiple people
Nick Weglarz (born 1987), Canadian baseball player
Nick Weiler-Babb (born 1995), American basketball player
Nick Wells (born 1951), American heavyweight boxer
Nick Werkman (born 1942), American basketball player
Nick West (disambiguation), multiple people
Nick Westbrook-Ikhine (born 1997), American football player
Nick Whale (born 1963), British racing driver
Nick Whalen (born 1973), Canadian politician
Nick Wheeler (born 1965), guitarist in the band The All-American Rejects
Nick Whitaker (born 1988), American actor
Nick White (disambiguation), multiple people
Nick Whyatt (born 1984), English ice hockey player
Nick Wickham, British film and television director
Nick Wieland (born 1988), American football player
Nick Wiger (born 1980), American comedian
Nick Williams (disambiguation), multiple people
Nick Willis (born 1983), New Zealand middle distance runner
Nick Wirth (born 1966), automotive engineer and the founder and owner of Wirth Research
Nick Wise (1866–1923), American baseball player
Nick Woltemade (born 2002), German footballer
Nick Wood (rugby union) (born 1983), English rugby footballer
Nick Woodman (born 1975), American businessman
Nick Wooster (born 1960), American fashion consultant
Nick Wright (disambiguation), multiple people
Nick Wyman (born 1950), American film and television actor

X
Nick Xenophon (born 1959), senator for South Australia

Y
Nick Yakich (1940–2019), Australian rugby player
Nick Yarris (born 1961), American writer and professional speaker
Nick Yates, Australian entrepreneur
Nick Yates (badminton) (born 1962), English badminton player
Nick Yee, American researcher
Nick Yelloly (born 1990), British racing driver
Nick Yorke (born 2002), American baseball player
Nick Yost (1915–1980), American basketball player
Nick Young (disambiguation), multiple people
Nick Youngquest (born 1983), Australian model and rugby player
Nick Youngs (born 1985), English rugby player

Z
Nick Zakelj (born 1999), American football player
Nick Zala (born 1959), pedal steel and guitar player
Nick Zano (born 1978), American actor and producer
Nick Zedd (born 1958), American filmmaker and author
Nick Zeisloft (born 1992), American basketball player
Nick Zerwas (born 1980), Minnesota politician
Nick Zimmerman, (born 1987) American soccer player
Nick Zinner (born 1974), guitarist for the rock band Yeah Yeah Yeahs
Nick Zisti (born 1972), Italian Australian rugby player
Nick Zito (born 1948), American thoroughbred horse trainer
Nick Zoricic (born 1983), Canadian ski cross skier

Surname
Peter Nick (born 1962), German molecular biologist

Fictional characters
Dr. Nick Riviera, in The Simpsons
Nick, a character in the 1993 American action movie Falling Down
Nick, from Netflix's Julie and the Phantoms
Nick, in the 1993 American action film Falling Down
Nick, in Guitar Hero World Tour
Nick Amaro, in the television series Law & Order: Special Victims Unit
Nick Bruiser, one the two final two opponents in Super NES video game Super Punch-Out!!
Nick Burkhardt, in the television series Grimm
Nick Carraway, the protagonist of the novel The Great Gatsby
Nicholas "Nick" Eliot, in The Crush (1993 film)
Nick Falco, a Law & Order character
Nick Fury, a Marvel Comics character
Nick Fury Jr., a Marvel Comics character
Nick Greeley, in the 2011 film Cyberbully
Nick Kamin, in the 1998 American comedy movie My Giant
Nick Miller, a character in American television series New Girl
Nick Moore, in the American sitcom television series Family Ties
Nick Murtaugh, in the 1987 American buddy cop action movie Lethal Weapon
Nick O'Bannon, in the film The Final Destination
 Nick Russell, the Red Ranger from Power Rangers: Mystic Force
Nick Stokes, in the television series CSI: Crime Scene Investigation
Nick Torres, in the television series NCIS
Nick Whitehall, in the 2012 movie We'll Meet Again
Nick Wilde, in the movie Zootopia
Nick/Niko, a doctor in Godzilla (1998 film)
Nick Zsigmond, played by Austin O'Brien in the 1994 American coming-of-age comedy-drama movie My Girl 2

See also
 British slang for stealing
Nickelodeon, commonly shortened to "Nick"
 "Nick", police pseudonym for Carl Beech (criminal)
Nik, given name
Nix (disambiguation)
 "Old Nick", a nickname for The Devil
Saint Nicholas (often referred to as "St. Nick"), Bishop of Myra

Masculine given names
Hypocorisms
English masculine given names
Surnames from given names